The 1957 Sveriges Grand Prix took place on 11 August, at the Rabelövsbanan, Kristianstad. Although this was the third running of the race, it was the last time as round of the F.I.A. World Sports Car Championship, and to sportscar regulations. Held on the same bumpy circuit as in 1956, the race differed this time, as it was for a period of six hours, instead of 1,000 km, it being felt that a time race would be more acceptable to the Swedish public.

Report

Entry
A grand total of 32 racing cars were registered for this event, of which 30 arrived for practice and 29 for qualified to race. Of the big manufacturers only Ferrari and Maserati entered official works teams, Jaguar fortunes being left in the hands of privateers, Ecurie Ecosse and Equipe Nationale Belge, which provided to being very successful at Le Mans in the previous round. As for Aston Martin, not a single car was to be seen in Sweden.  The Officine Alfieri Maserati had two 450Ss, both being a Spyder version. They were backed-up by two Maserati 300Ss. As for drivers, the team had the choice of Stirling Moss, Jean Behra, Harry Schell, Giorgio Scarlatti and Jo Bonnier. As for Scuderia Ferrari, their entry consisted of two 335 Ss and a 250 TR, and they had the choice of Mike Hawthorn, Peter Collins, Luigi Musso, Phil Hill, Maurice Trintignant and Olivier Gendebien.   

As for Le Mans winners, Ecurie Ecosse had two Jaguar D-Types presented for Jack Fairman, Jock Lawrence, Ninian Sanderson and Archie Scott Brown. The other Jag was run by the Equipe Nationale Belge and driven by Alain de Changy and Claude Debois. The Belgian outfit was entered three Ferraris and a Porsche 550.

Qualifying
During the two qualifying sessions held on two days prior to the race, the Maserati of Jean Behra emerged the fastest, putting his 450S on pole.

Race
At 12 noon, in front of 30,000 spectators, Hill was first away, however, Hawthorn soon tore past him into the lead and began to set the early pace, followed by Moss, Sanderson and Masten Gregory, who made a terrific in his smaller Ferrari. Behra who had made a leisurely start, was soon ahead of Gregory to claim fourth. Meanwhile, his team-mate Moss was into his stride and went past Hawthorn giving Maserati the lead. As for Hawthorn, he had been over using his brakes, while his team-mate Hill was content to take it easy and conserve his brakes, and therefore was not worry Behra passed him. After 30 minutes of racing Moss was leading from Hawthorn by 3 sec followed by Behra, Hill, Gregory, Sanderson, Gendebien, Bonnier and Lawrence. Such was the early pace those eight cars were the only ones on the same lap as the leaders. Shortly after this, Behra moved up into second place. Just a quarter of an hour later, Behra was right behind Moss and then went ahead. As for Hawthorn, he was now 17 sec behind at the end of the first hour.

Around the 45-minute mark, the Le Mans winning team, Ecurie Ecosse were as neat and quick as at Circuit de la Sarthe, with Sanderson’s car taken over from Jack Fairman, while Lawrence remained in the other Jag. Around an hour later, Hawthorn brought his Ferrari into the pits, the cars was refuelled and Musso took over the car, and it was seen that the car had been off the road at one point. An early sign, it was running out of brakes. Five minutes later, team-mate Gendebien pitted with a dead engine, and retired, leaving Trintignant among the ranks of the unwanted drivers. Meanwhile, on track Moss and Behra had now settled down to an impressive one-two, the Englishman leading, while Musso, Hill and Bonnier followed. Just after the two-hour mark, Moss brought the lead Maserati into the pits, it was refuelled and Schell took over and when Bonnier pitted, Scarlatti took over, even though the team had said he would be driving with Behra. It was clear that Maserati plan was to get both their 450S’s in first and second places, using their fastest three drivers, Moss, Behra and Schell. At 2:27pm, Hill came in and gave his car over to Collins, with the Ferrari now in second place, and then three minutes later, Behra came in with the leading Maserati and Moss took it over, spending just 50 seconds changing rear wheels and refuelling whilst retaining the lead. At the same time, Lawrence arrived sideways in the pits with a locking brake, but managed to avoid hitting anything and after a refuel Scott Brown took over. So now the positions were Moss, Collins, Schell, Musso with Scott Brown rounding out the top five.  

Just before half distance, Schell’s Maserati started making unusual noises, and eventually slowed and pitted. As the drive shaft grease retaining seal had split, the team retired the car. Scarlatti was called into the pits and Schell took over the car. By now Moss’s lead over Collins was 65 seconds, about half-a-lap, with Musso a lap adrift in third. At 3:15pm, the windy dull day, turned worse with pouring rain. Collins started to lost ground rapidly, as his Ferrari’s brakes were being too erratic in the wet conditions, to take any chances. 15 minutes, later Musso trundled slowly towards pits with a punctured rear tyre, dropping the car down to fifth, behind Scott-Brown and Schell. The 30-minute spell of rain, Moss gained another half-a-lap on Collins, giving him a full lap advantage over his countryman.  

After nearly four hours of racing, Moss stopped and handed his Maserati back to Behra, after refuelling it continued without losing the lead, though Collins did un-lap himself. There was just a five-minute rest before Schell was ordered back to the pits and the car handed over to Moss. When the rain stopped and the sun returned, the track dried quickly, so that Collins began to put on speed, but it was not enough to gain in Behra. As the final hour approached, Hill was ready to take over from Collins and Musso about to switch with Hawthorn, with Ferraris needing just one more fuel stop each. Although the team signalled Collins to pit, Hawthorn arrived pointing at the bonnet. As per normal, the Scuderia mechanics fuelled the car, the oil tank topped up, windscreen cleaned, rear wheels changed, drivers swapped and Musso was off. However, Hawthorn pitted early as the car’s water temperature was high and radiator needed water, not realising the fuel stops were nigh.  

By now, Fairman was in trouble with his Jaguar having only second gear available in him. With just 45 minutes remaining, Musso suddenly pits with a smoking Ferrari. This was found to be a broken pipe with as leaking onto the exhaust system. The Scuderia mechanics hammered the offending pip flat, and Musso returned to the race with only three brakes. This resulted in Moss moving up the fourth in the 300S.  

With only 15 minutes left the Scott Brown Jaguar, now being driven by Lawrence, was being caught by Moss, while Behra was safely in the lead, letting Hill un-lap himself, knowing that as long as he can see the Ferrari, he will win the race. Suddenly Lawrence oil pip broke, spraying him with oil. In the confusion, he hit a bank and split the fuel tank, so that Ecurie Ecosse hopes were over, as Fairman was still running with his gearbox troubles.  

When the chequered flag fell, Behra won, with Hill second in the Ferrari. Moss came home in third in the older, smaller Maserati, while Musso took fourth. Behra and Moss in car number 7, took an impressive victory, winning in a time of 6hrs :01.01.1 mins., averaging a speed of 97.886mph. In second was the Ferrari of Hill and Collins, one lap adrift. Although Maserati had achieved the win, their Italian rivals were still ahead in Championship points, thanks to Hill and Collins.

Official classification
Class winners are in bold text.

 Fastest Lap: Jean Behra, 2:20.9secs (103.782mph)

Class winners

Standings after the race

Note: Only the top five positions are included in this set of standings.
Championship points were awarded for the first six places in each race in the order of 8-6-4-3-2-1. Manufacturers were only awarded points for their highest finishing car with no points awarded for positions filled by additional cars. Only the best 4 results out of the 7 races could be retained by each manufacturer. Points earned but not counted towards the championship totals are listed within brackets in the above table.

References

Swedish Grand Prix
Swedish Grand Prix
Rabelövsbanan
Swedish Grand Prix